Clive Ashborn is an English actor. He is probably best known for appearing in V for Vendetta as Guy Fawkes. He graduated from Academy of Live and Recorded Arts in 2001. He played the character Koleniko in Pirates of the Caribbean: Dead Man's Chest (2006) and Pirates of the Caribbean: At World's End (2007). He also recently appeared in the horror-thriller film The Love Witch (2016) as Professor King, a professor of the occult.

Filmography

References

External links
 
 Legend Theatre biography

English male film actors
English male stage actors
English male television actors
Living people
Year of birth missing (living people)
Place of birth missing (living people)
Alumni of the Academy of Live and Recorded Arts